The Battle of Mufilo was a battle occurring on 27 August 1907, in the southwest of Portuguese Angola, during the Ovambo resistance to Portuguese colonization.

Bibliography 

 René Pélissier, Les Guerres Grises, résistances et révoltes en Angola (1845–1941), Éditions Pélissier, Orgeval, 1978.

Mufilo
Mufilo
Mufilo
Portuguese Angola
1907 in Africa
African resistance to colonialism